The 1984 Augustana (Illinois) Vikings football team was an American football team that represented Augustana College as a member of the College Conference of Illinois and Wisconsin (CCIW) during the 1984 NCAA Division III football season. In their sixth season under head coach Bob Reade, the Vikings compiled a perfect 12–0 record and won the CCIW championship. It was the second of four consecutive national championships.

The team's statistical leaders included Kirk Bednar with 602 passing yards, Brad Price with 1,034 rushing yards, Ron Nelson with 1,001 rushing yards, Norm Singbush with 475 receiving yards, and Ron Nelson with 96 points scored.

They played their home games at Ericson Field in Rock Island, Illinois.

Schedule

References

Augustana
Augustana (Illinois) Vikings football seasons
NCAA Division III Football Champions
College football undefeated seasons
Augustana (Illinois) Vikings football